The Samsung Galaxy S6 Active (stylized as SΛMSUNG Galaxy S6 active) is an Android smartphone produced by Samsung Electronics. In the United States it was only available on the AT&T network. As a variant of the Samsung Galaxy S6, the S6 Active contains similar specifications, but it also features waterproofing, shockproofing and dustproofing designed around the IP68 specifications, along with a more rugged design and physical navigation buttons instead of touch sensors; it was released on 12 June 2015.

Release 
The S6 Active was first released in the United States by AT&T on 12 June 2015 in the gray, camo-blue, and camo-white colors; its model number is SM–G890A.

Specifications 

The S6 Active inherits most of its hardware components from the Galaxy S6, including an identical octa-core processor, 3 GB of RAM, and a 5.1-inch display. It uses the same display type as the S6, and has a 16 megapixel camera. Its hardware design is similar to the S6, except it is slightly thicker, has metallic rivets, and uses three physical navigation keys instead of a physical home key and capacitive back/menu keys like the S6. The S6 Active launched with similar software to the S6,Android 5.0.2 with TouchWiz. At 3,500 mAh, its battery has a greater capacity than the S6, and retains wireless-charging support. It has an additional app when compared to the S6, Activity Zone, which provides quick access to a compass, flashlight, stopwatch and Weather.

Reception
In The Verge's review of the S6 Active, it listed six reasons to get the phone rather than the regular S6:
 It is water resistant and shock proof.
 The battery has 37% more capacity than the S6.
 The Active has a button on the left side above the volume rocker that can be configured to launch any app.
 The phone runs cool and sometimes the S6 runs hot.
 It is only $10 more than the normal version.
 It has the same performance and camera as the S6.

As well as listing five reasons to get the S6 rather than the S6 Active:
 The Active has a plastic case rather than a metal one.
 The Active does not have a fingerprint scanner.
 The Active only comes in 32 GB and 64 GB models compared to an additional 128 GB variant of the S6.
 The Active is only available through AT&T. (This was only true for the US)
 Firmware and security updates for the S6 Active will be issued less frequently than for the S6.

See also 
 Comparison of Samsung Galaxy S smartphones
 Samsung Galaxy S series
 Samsung Galaxy Xcover 3
 Samsung Rugby Smart

References

External links
 

Samsung mobile phones
Samsung Galaxy
Mobile phones introduced in 2015
Mobile phones with infrared transmitter
Discontinued smartphones